Guerrilla Mail is a free disposable email address service launched in 2006. Visitors are automatically assigned a random email address upon visiting the site.

Features 
Guerrilla Mail randomly generates disposable email addresses. Disposable email addresses may be used as a means of spam prevention. They may also be used if the user does not wish to give a real email, for example if they fear a data breach. Emails sent to addresses are kept for one hour before deletion. The site offers some choice of email domain names.

History 
Guerrilla Mail was founded in 2006, in Chicago.

Privacy-centered services saw an up-tick in public interest after the global surveillance disclosures beginning in 2013, especially concerning attention brought to materials leaked by Edward Snowden. According to The Mercury News in 2014, "[Guerrilla Mail] has done nearly half of its business in the past year".

In December 2013, a Harvard College sophomore and Quincy House resident Eldo Kim used Guerrilla Mail to send a bomb threat to offices associated with Harvard, including the Harvard University Police Department and The Harvard Crimson, in order to delay a final exam. It was alleged in an affidavit that the student accessed Guerrilla Mail through Tor, a fact that might've been given away in the IP address present in the email header.

In June 2017, it was revealed through court documents that the FBI used a social engineering technique known as phishing to target a Guerrilla Mail user. The case was unique, as it was the "first public example of the feds using a controversial update to a law allowing searches on users of anonymizing tools like Tor".

As of November 4, 2020, Guerrilla Mail stated on Twitter that their site has been taken down by their hosting provider, OVHCloud, due to a law enforcement request which OVHCloud refused to provide details about. The site has since been reinstated.

References

External links
GuerrillaMail.com

Email
Companies established in 2006